William George Beers (May 5, 1841 – December 26, 1900) was a Canadian dentist who founded Canada's first dental journal and served as the founding dean of the Dental College of the Province of Quebec. In addition, he is referred to as the "father of modern lacrosse" for his work establishing the first set of playing rules for the game.

Dentistry

Beers was a successful and notable dentist.  After finishing his schooling in 1856, Beers completed a dental apprenticeship.  By the early 1860s, Beers was a successful dentist and began publishing article in journals. In 1868, he founded Canada's first dental journal, the Canada Journal of Dental Science.   Although this publication failed, he went on to start the Dominion Dental Journal in 1889, which eventually became the modern day Journal of the Canadian Dental Association. He was instrumental in the founding of Quebec's first dental college - the Dental College of the Province of Quebec, founded in 1892 and served as its founding dean.  In 1896, this College became affiliated with Bishop's University and later became the McGill University Faculty of Dentistry.  He held the position of Dean at Bishop's for only a short time; differences in opinion regarding curriculum and concerns over the use of untrained dental assistants led Beers to resign from the position.

Nationalism
Beers was a strong Canadian nationalist. Besides advocating for lacrosse to become the national sport of Canada believing it would serve as "unifying symbol for the emerging Canadian nationality," Beers also defended the country against the Fenian Raids in 1866 and 1870.   During the raids, Beers helped establish the Victoria Rifles of Canada.

Lacrosse
William Beers was involved with lacrosse from a young age.  As a teenager in 1856 he was a member of the Montreal Lacrosse Club. He was selected at the age of 17 to be a goalkeeper for a Montreal exhibition team that played a match before the Prince of Wales.

In 1860, Beers began to codify the first written rules of the modern game. Prior to this, all rules of the game needed to be decided prior to each game.

In 1867, as lacrosse was growing significantly in popularity, Beers created the Canadian National Lacrosse Foundation. In 1869, Beers published a book on lacrosse entitled Lacrosse: The National Game of Canada. In 1876, Beers organized a team of Canadian players and Indians players to tour England, Scotland, and Ireland to showcase the sport.  During this trip in 1876, Queen Victoria witnessed an exhibition game and was impressed, saying "The game is very pretty to watch." Her endorsement was enough for many English girls' schools to adopt the sport in the 1890s. Again in 1883, Beers returned to England to showcase lacrosse.  This time Beers brought two teams to play exhibition game.

Death 
William George Beers died of heart disease on December 26th, 1900. His estate donated his massive library of dentistry publications to the Royal College of Dental Surgeons of Ontario.

Bibliography

References

External links
 

1841 births
1900 deaths
Canadian dentists
Canadian lacrosse players
Persons of National Historic Significance (Canada)
Pre-Confederation Quebec people
Sports inventors and innovators
19th-century American dentists
Lacrosse people in Canada